Connecticut's 76th House of Representatives district elects one member of the Connecticut House of Representatives. It consists of the towns of Burlington, Harwinton, Thomaston, and parts of Litchfield. It has been represented by Republican John Piscopo since 1989.

Recent elections

2020

2018

2016

2014

2012

References

76